Local elections were held for Wyre Borough Council on 7 May 2015, the same day as the 2015 United Kingdom general election and other 2015 United Kingdom local elections. Local elections are held every four years with all councillors up for election in multi-member electoral wards.

Following the election, the composition of the council is now as follows:

Election result

Boundary review

The Local Government Boundary Commission for England reviewed the local boundaries of Wyre council in 2014.

The changes are made official by The Wyre (Electoral Changes) Order 2014.

References

2015 English local elections
May 2015 events in the United Kingdom
2015
2010s in Lancashire